Emma Spool (also known simply as Mrs. Spool) is a fictional character created by screenwriter Tom Holland for the 1983 film Psycho II. She serves as the primary antagonist, and is portrayed by Claudia Bryar. More attention is given to her character in Psycho III, although she only appears as a corpse.

In the Psycho sequels

Psycho II
Emma Spool, the cook at a diner in the (fictional) town, Fairvale, California, urges owner Ralph Statler to make Norman Bates (Anthony Perkins)—newly released from the mental institution he was institutionalized in during the original film—the cook's helper. Statler accepts and Norman meets with Mrs. Spool. At about this time, a series of brutal murders occur that bear a similarity to the ones Norman committed years before.

In the film's final scene, Mrs. Spool comes to visit Norman and reveals to him that she is his real mother. She tells him that she had him when she was very young and out of wedlock. She was put away by the state and her sister, Norma Bates, took Norman in her care, raising him as her son. Mrs. Spool, while telling him this, is unaware she is actually sipping tea which Norman has poisoned. The poison takes effect and Mrs. Spool begins to cough. Norman picks up a nearby shovel and hits her on the head, killing her.

Norman takes his new "Mother" upstairs, and begins talking to himself in Spool's voice, recreating his murderous "Mother" persona.

Psycho III
A month later, Mrs. Spool's murder remains undiscovered and she is thought missing. By now, Norman has begun his murder spree anew, keeping and communicating with Mrs. Spool's preserved corpse in the same way he had with Mrs. Bates. A reporter named Tracy Venable (Roberta Maxwell) comes to Fairvale to investigate the murders, and quickly suspects Norman.

Eventually, an itinerant musician named Duane Duke (Jeff Fahey) discovers the truth about Mrs. Spool. Norman kills Duane when he tries to use Norman's secret to extort money from him. Tracy eventually discovers the truth behind Mrs. Spool's disappearance, as well as her true identity: Spool was in fact Norman's aunt, and killed Norman's father, John, in a jealous rage after he left her for her sister. Spool then kidnapped the child Norman, having convinced herself that he was her own. She was arrested and institutionalized, and Norman was returned to Mrs. Bates.

Tracy confronts Norman, who is now assuming the "Mother" personality, and tells him the truth about Spool and his mother. At last knowing the truth, Norman rebels against "Mother" and destroys Spool's corpse.

Continuity
The 1990 sequel/prequel Psycho IV: The Beginning seemingly retcons the character of Emma Spool; in this film, Norman's father is stung to death by bees and not by Emma. The events of the sequels are briefly mentioned by Norman in the present setting as he mentions causing more murders some years earlier.

Behind the scenes
For the murder of Mrs. Spool in Psycho II (being hit with a shovel on the head), a special effects dummy was used that is seen in the interview of Andrew London (editor of Psycho II) on the official website of the Psycho movies. Although the Spool dummy can be seen for a brief second, Claudia Bryar performed Mrs. Spool's death.

Other notes
Mrs. Spool was also played by Kurt Paul, who was Claudia Bryar's stunt-in for the murder scenes in Psycho II. Coincidentally, Paul later played Norman Bates in the 1987 television film Bates Motel and the Norman Bates-like coroner "Norman Blates" in the sitcom Sledge Hammer! (1986–1988).

Footnotes

External links
 
 Pictures of Mrs. Spool on “Cinemorgue”
 Analysis of the Mothers in the Psycho franchise

Female horror film villains
Fictional serial killers
Fictional characters from California
Film characters introduced in 1982
Fictional kidnappers
Psycho (franchise) characters
Fictional chefs
Fictional murdered people